Jonas Lenherr  (born 24 March 1989) is a Swiss freestyle skier.

He competed in the 2017 FIS Freestyle World Ski Championships, and in the 2018 Winter Olympics.

References

External links

1989 births
Living people
Swiss male freestyle skiers
Olympic freestyle skiers of Switzerland
Freestyle skiers at the 2018 Winter Olympics
21st-century Swiss people